In 1921, the Toronto Transportation Commission (TTC) was created to integrate and operate the Toronto streetcar system. It inherited the infrastructure of two separate streetcar operators: the Toronto Railway Company (TRC) and Toronto Civic Railways (TCR). The TTC immediately embarked on a program to connect the TRC and TCR lines into one network. The TTC had to rebuild most of the track to provide a wider devilstrip so that the wider Peter Witt streetcars it was ordering could pass without sideswiping. Between 1938 and 1945, it placed five orders for air-electric PCC streetcars to replace the old, wooden streetcars of the TRC, and to address rising ridership. Between 1947 and 1951, the TTC placed three orders for all-electric PCC cars, with one order equipped with couplers for multiple-unit operation. Between 1950 and 1957, the TTC purchased PCCs from four American cities (Cincinnati, Cleveland, Birmingham and Kansas City). By 1957, the TTC (later renamed the Toronto Transit Commission in 1954, which uses the same acronym) had more PCCs than any other city in North America. After the opening of the Bloor–Danforth subway (today Line 2 Bloor–Danforth) in 1966, the TTC considered terminating all streetcar service in Toronto. However, in 1972, a citizens group led by Jane Jacobs and Steve Munro called "Streetcars for Toronto" persuaded the City to retain streetcar operation. This led to the development of the Canadian Light Rail Vehicle (CLRV) and its longer, articulated cousin, the Articulated Light Rail Vehicle (ALRV), to replace the aging PCC fleet. The Accessibility for Ontarians with Disabilities Act, 2005 (AODA) mandated that the next generation of streetcars be wheelchair-accessible. Thus, to replace the CLRVs and ALRVs, Bombardier adapted its low-floor Flexity Outlook model for the TTC to navigate the Toronto streetcar system's tight curves and single-point switches, characteristics set in the 1920s to accommodate Peter Witt streetcars.

Inherited streetcars 
When the Toronto Transportation Commission was created in 1921, it inherited the facilities of its two predecessor companies: the Toronto Railway Company (TRC) and the Toronto Civic Railways (TCR).

Ex-TRC streetcars

The Toronto Transportation Commission inherited 830 streetcars from the Toronto Railway Company. However, the TTC found that only 351 of them were worth retaining; thus, the TTC disposed of the remaining 479 by 1924. (Two of the disposed cars were relicshorsecar 64, built in 1879, and streetcar 306, built in 1892. Both were ultimately sent to the Canada Science and Technology Museum in Ottawa.)

The 351 streetcars the TTC chose to retain were single-ended streetcars built between 1906 and 1917 in the TRC's own shops. They were all even-numbered and retained their original TRC car numbers. The TTC modified these streetcars and reclassified them into four classes by sets of features.

The A- and A1-class cars were operated from the mid-1920s as six-motor trains with an A1-class (four-motor) car leading a coupled A-class (2-motor) car. These trains required a crew of three, two for the lead car and another for the trailing car. Six-motor trains lasted until 1933 when the A-class cars were retired due to a decline of ridership during the Great Depression. After the retirement of the A-class cars, the A1-class cars would pull a Class N or Q trailer until 1934.

The Class C cars had a Tomlinson coupler to pull a Class N or Q trailer, which in later years would be semi-permanently attached. The Class C cars were retired in 1949. The trailers were then reassigned. Class C-1 was a variation of Class C omitting the coupler. These cars required a two-man crew.

The Class BB class was the largest group of ex-TRC cars. Twenty BB-class cars were transferred to other cities during World War II: 5 to Fort William, 10 to Ottawa and 5 to Quebec City. The Class BB cars were the last of the ex-TRC cars to be retired, the last forty being retired in 1951. Class BB car 1326 is preserved at the Halton County Radial Railway museum. These cars required a crew of one.

Between 1923 and 1933, the TTC modified all of its ex-TRC cars, at least once, often twice and in one case (1328) three times, each time converting the car from one class to another. A common second conversion was from C or C1 (two-man operation) to BB class (1-man operation). All C1 cars and many C-class cars were converted to BB-class by 1933. The following tables reflect the classes of retained ex-TRC streetcars after the final modification. The table is in TRC class and year built sequence, and roughly in car number sequence.

Ex-TCR streetcars

The TTC inherited the TCR fleet in 1921, and renumbered the cars (using even numbers only) in May 1923. Many of the TRC stayed in passenger service in Toronto until 1948. All TCR cars were double-ended.

The TTC initially used the four Class I double-truck streetcars (TCR 120–123, TTC 2120–2126) for temporary service on lines being converted from single to double-track. All were scrapped in 1936, with the exception of car 2120, which the TTC converted into a snow scraper and used on the North Yonge Railways until 1948.

The TTC used the double-truck Class H cars (TCR 100–119, TTC 2128–2144 & 2148–2166) mainly on the Weston route and also on Spadina route until 1948. TCR car 109 (TTC 2146) was destroyed by fire in 1921.

The Class J (TCR 200–212, TTC 2168–2192) double-truck streetcars, ran mainly on the Spadina route and also on the Weston route until 1948.

The TTC used the Class F, single-truck streetcars (TCR 50–57, TTC 2200–2214) for rush-hour service until 1926 after which they were converted into snow scrapers. The only three survivors of the entire TCR fleet are from this class, and all three are preserved at the Halton County Radial Railway museum in Milton, Ontario. Preserved TCR car 55 (TTC 2210) was restored to its original TCR condition. The TTC had converted the other two surviving Class F cars into rail grinders and both are preserved as such at the museum. TCR 52 (TTC 2204) became subway rail grinder RT-7, and TCR 57 (TTC 2214) became streetcar system rail grinder W-28.

Class G (TCR: 60–84, TTC 2216–2264) consisted of single-truck Birney cars, which were used on various TTC routes, such as Davenport and Coxwell, until 1940. The cars were sold in 1927, 1940 and 1941 to run in Cornwall and Halifax until 1949, after which they were scrapped.

In May 1923, the TTC renumbered all the TCR streetcars with even numbers only. The year retired column refers to retirement from passenger service in Toronto; it excludes cars sold to other operators (Class G) or retirements from work car service after conversion.

Peter Witt streetcars

The Peter Witt streetcars were the first new vehicles ordered by the Toronto Transportation Commission; however, they required a major change in the trackwork before they could run.

The Peter Witt streetcars, the first all-steel streetcars in Toronto, came in two versions: large and small. The large Witts had a slow speed but the strength to pull a trailer. The small Witts were faster in operation, could move along better in traffic but could not pull a trailer. Trailer-trains were used on heavily travelled routes such as Yonge, Bloor, College and Dundas.

A streetcar gets a "Peter Witt" designation if it was built using the Peter Witt fare payment design. With Peter Witt streetcars, passengers enter by the front doors and pay their fare as they walk past the conductor seated just before centre doors. Passengers must pay their fare when they pass the conductor either to exit the car by the centre doors or to access the rear of the car. This scheme was dubbed "pay-as-you-pass". Passengers could ride in the unpaid front portion of the car or in the paid rear portion. During the Great Depression, many Witt cars were converted to one-man operation, eliminating the conductor's position and relocating the fare box at the car's entrance.

The "Peter Witt" trailers were not of the Peter Witt design because of their door arrangement. The Class N trailers had two narrow centre doors flanking the conductor's position, and were slow to load and unload. Thus, the three-door Class Q trailers (also known as Harvey trailers) were introduced with a double door on one side of the conductor's position and a single, narrow door on the other side. One of the doors had a gate so that it could be used as either an entry or exit.

Originally, all but the class P small Witts had a fully enclosed operator cab. (This feature would not be repeated in Toronto until the introduction of the Flexity Outlook in 2014.) Around 1940, the cab walls were removed.

The first major retirement came in 1938 with the introduction of PCC streetcars. All 60 class N trailers and 30 of the class Q trailers were withdrawn with PCCs replacing Peter Witt trailer-trains on the Bloor and Dundas streetcar routes. These were the first of the new cars purchased by the TTC to be scrapped after only 15–17 years of service. The next major retirement came in 1954 with the opening of the Yonge subway (today a part of Line 1 Yonge–University). All the remaining trailers and all of the large Peter Witt cars were retired. The subway replaced the Yonge streetcar line, which heavily used Peter Witt trailer-trains. The final major retirement, this time of the remaining small Peter Witt cars, came in 1965 following the opening of the University subway in 1963 (also a part of Line 1 Yonge–University).

Motor cars are even-numbered; trailers are odd-numbered:

The following is the list of preserved TTC Peter Witt cars:

PCC streetcars

The TTC was among the first transit agencies to buy the then-state-of-the-art PCC streetcars, which were designed by a committee of public transport operators in the 1930s but were modified to the TTC's specifications. The TTC bought these cars to replace the Peter Witt cars and older vehicles inherited from the Toronto Railway Company. The TTC's first purchase was in 1938, and by the end of the 1950s, they operated a larger fleet of PCCs than any other agency in the world with 744 cars in service.

The TTC purchased 745 PCC streetcars in all, 317 air-electric (with air-compressor) and 428 all-electric (no air-compressor), 540 new and 205 used (from several U.S. operators abandoning streetcar service). 175 PCCs had couplers for multiple-unit operation, and the TTC used them to assemble two-car PCC trains. (The TTC had only a maximum of 744 PCCs in service because PCC 4063 was scrapped after it derailed and crashed into a carhouse wall in 1947.)

In 1963, with the opening of the University subway (part of today's Line 1 Yonge–University) and the closure of the Dupont streetcar route, the last of the Peter Witt streetcars were retired resulting in a 100 percent PCC streetcar fleet.

The first major retirement of PCCs occurred with the opening of the Bloor–Danforth subway (today Line 2 Bloor–Danforth) in 1966. The heavily used Bloor streetcar line (where two-car PCC trains ran) plus four intersecting streetcar routes (Coxwell, Harbord, Parliament, Fort) were abandoned. The all-electric PCCs from the Bloor route were moved elsewhere displacing the older air-electric cars, many of which were sold to a transit operator in Egypt.

In the late 1980s, as CLRVs were replacing the ageing PCC fleet, the TTC started to create a new class of PCC cars (class A15) by rebuilding A8-class cars. By 1992, it had rebuilt 19 PCCs for use on the new 604 Harbourfront streetcar line (part of today's 509 Harbourfront service). However, in 1995, the A15 class PCCs were retired because the CLRV fleet could handle the ridership, which had declined by that time. The TTC retained A15-class PCCs 4500 and 4549 for excursions and special events.

The following PCC streetcars made up the TTC fleet:

CLRVs and ALRVs

In the 1970s, the Urban Transportation Development Corporation (UTDC), an Ontario Crown corporation developed the Canadian Light Rail Vehicle (CLRV) which would replace the PCC in Toronto. The UTDC hoped to sell CLRVs, or variations of it, to other streetcar and light rail systems in North America. Subsequently, in the 1980s, the UTDC developed the Articulated Light Rail Vehicle (ALRV), the longer, articulated version of the CLRV.

The first six CLRVs (4000–4005, class L1) were built by Schweizerische Industrie Gesellschaft (Swiss Industrial Company, SIG), and were tested in Switzerland serving as prototypes. The remaining 190 CLRVs (4010–4199, class L2) were built by Hawker Siddeley Canada Limited in Thunder Bay. The CLRVs went into revenue service on route 507 Long Branch on September 30, 1979. The vehicles were originally equipped with couplers, but these were removed between 1984 and 1988, and shields were placed over the empty coupler pockets to protect pedestrians.

In August 1982, the UTDC delivered an ALRV prototype, number 4900, which the TTC operated in revenue service for several months. Prototype 4900 had features that were not implemented on either CLRVs or production ALRVs such as hand controls instead of foot controls, and electronic destination signs instead of linen rollsigns. The prototype had couplers while subsequent production units did not. After sitting in storage at the St. Clair Carhouse since early 1983, prototype 4900 was returned to the UTDC's Kingston facility in 1987 where, a year later, it was damaged in a test track collision. It was scrapped in 1997.

ALRV 4200, the first of the 52 production ALRVs (4200–4251, class L3), arrived in Toronto on June 11, 1987; ALRV 4204 began revenue service on route 507 Long Branch on January 19, 1988. Unlike the CLRVs, none of the production ALRVs was equipped with couplers, and shields covered their coupler pockets.

In 2006, CLRV 4041 was modified for air conditioning with a visibly distinctive air conditioning unit installed on its roof. It was a prototype for a proposed refurbishment project that was shelved.

The passage of Accessibility for Ontarians with Disabilities Act in 2005 affected the high-floor CLRV/ALRV fleet because the act mandated all public transport to be fully accessible by 2025. In 2006, TTC staff explored ways to make the old fleet wheelchair-accessible, including constructing installing wheelchair lifts and attaching wheelchair-accessible trailers, but concluded that these options were impractical, and recommended replacing the old fleet with new low-floor streetcars.

As the CLRV/ALRV fleet aged, its reliability declined. In later years, the propulsion control system became unreliable and difficult to maintain as obsolete electronic and electrical parts became difficult to source. By 2014, the old fleet became vulnerable to extreme cold snaps. On January 3, 2014, this resulted in a breakdown of 50 out of the 195 streetcars required for rush hour service; water vapour had frozen in the pneumatic air lines, preventing brakes and doors from functioning.

During an extreme cold snap between January 20 and 21, 2019, the TTC withdrew all CLRV/ALRV streetcars from service due to the high risk of breakdowns in the cold weather. Streetcar service during this period was provided by the Flexity Outlook streetcars and supplemented by buses.

Starting in 2015, the TTC rebuilt 30 CLRVs and 20 ALRVs to extend their service life because of delays in delivery of the new Flexity Outlook streetcars. The TTC had expected to use some CLRVs and ALRVs to supplement the Flexity streetcars until 2024 to address increased ridership. However, by November 2018, the ALRV fleet had so deteriorated that only two or three of the 20 refurbished ALRVs were available for service on any one day. The TTC decommissioned all ALRVs by September 2, 2019, and followed suit with the CLRVs on December 29, 2019.

The TTC sold CLRV 4187 to a railway enthusiast in an auction; the vehicle is being displayed in Priceville in Grey Highlands in Grey County, Ontario.

Flexity Outlook

By 2007, as the CLRV/ALRV fleet was nearing the end of its service life and becoming less reliable, the TTC began looking for a manufacturer to build new streetcars. In 2009, the TTC announced that it had chosen a customized version of the Bombardier Flexity Outlook as the model to replace the old fleet. The TTC had required Bombardier to modify its Flexity Outlook design to handle the legacy system's trackwork, the standards for which mainly date back to the Peter Witt era of the 1920s. Light rail vehicles typically require double-point switches, a  radius and a maximum 5 percent grade. The minimum radius requirement was the most challenging for Bombardier. The TTC estimated that it would have taken ten years to widen the curve radius throughout the system.

Unlike the CLRV/ALRV, the new vehicles feature a low-floor design, a loading ramp for wheelchair access, air-conditioning (only one CLRV had air-conditioning), a doubling of the passenger capacity, an interior bicycle area, a separated enclosed driver/operator cab walled off from the passenger area, on-board automatic fare vending machines, and electronic destination signs at the front, side and rear of the vehicle (as opposed to roll signs). They were also the first streetcars that had two audible warning signals, featuring both an electronic gong and a horn, as opposed to the CLRVs and ALRVs, which were originally delivered with physical gongs only but had been retrofitted with horns in the late 1990s. The first two Flexity Outlook streetcars entered revenue service on August 31, 2014, on route 510 Spadina.

Each Flexity Outlook streetcar is equipped with both a trolley pole and a pantograph for electrical pickup. (All older streetcars use a trolley pole.) Flexity Outlook streetcars operate with pantographs on routes where the electrical overhead has been converted for pantograph use. The introduction of Flexity streetcars is leading to the gradual phase-out of the trolley pole on the Toronto streetcar system.

During the manufacture of the Flexity Outlook streetcars, Bombardier experienced manufacturing and quality control problems mainly with welding at one of its plants. This resulted in major delivery delays, in that by the end of 2017, only 59 streetcars were delivered when about 150 were expected. In addition, in 2018, Bombardier requested the gradual recall of 67 vehicles to correct welding problems. With the delivery problems, and the retirement of many CLRV/ALRV streetcars too worn out to repair, a streetcar shortage occurred resulting in temporary bus replacements along some streetcar routes. Bombardier expects to return all recalled Flexity Outlook streetcars by 2023. On October 31, 2018, Bombardier was expected to deliver the remainder of the 204-vehicle order by the end of 2019.

On January 24, 2020, the TTC took delivery of the last of 204 Flexity Outlook streetcars ordered from Bombardier. Streetcar 4603 was delivered by rail to the Hillcrest Complex from Bombardier's Thunder Bay plant. The last streetcar was a little over three weeks late, as Bombardier had promised to deliver the last car by the end of 2019.

Work cars
Excluding rubber-tire vehicles with extendable rail wheels, the Toronto streetcar system no longer has any rail-based work vehicles after the 1990s. The last such vehicles, rail grinding cars W-30 and W-31, were retired in 2002, their last assignment being in 1999. Except for rail grinders, all other types of work vehicles were retired before 1980. CLRVs 4089 and 4124, retired in 2019, are being reserved for future role as work cars.

Work cars had specialized duties. Besides rail grinding, there were work vehicles for snow clearing, construction (cranes, dump cars and flat cars) and deliveries for carhouses (e.g. sand cars, fare box cars). All these cars were self-propelled, taking power from the streetcar overhead wire. Some work cars—such as dump cars, track plows and snow sweepers—were purchased from outside rail equipment manufacturers. In some cases, the TTC inherited a car built in the shops of its predecessor, the Toronto Railway Company—for example, crane C-1 and the fare box car (for hauling tickets and fare boxes between carhouses and head office). In many cases, cars such as rail grinders and snow scrapers were former passenger streetcars that the TTC converted to work cars. Old cars used for such conversions were usually inherited from the Toronto Railway Company and the Toronto Civic Railways. However, in one case, the TTC used a pair of PCCs to create rail grinding cars W-30 and W-31.

Rail-based, snow-clearing cars were retired in the 1970s when City of Toronto Public Works department trucks took over that function. To clear light snow, the TTC purchased 12 snow sweepers in 1940 from the Third Avenue Railway System (TARS) of New York City and numbered them S-30 to S-41. These cars were built by Russell Car Company in 1920–1921 and were double-truck, double-end vehicles. The TTC scrapped two of the sweepers in 1966; the remainder remained active until 1971 and were retired in 1972. After retirement, one sweeper was sold to a transit operator in New Jersey. For heavier snowfall, the TTC acquired two snow plows, TP-10 and TP-11, from National Steel Car. Both cars are preserved at museums.

The following table lists work cars preserved at museums, a few of which are pictured above:

See also 
 Toronto-gauge railways

References 

 
 
 

Toronto Transit Commission